Flight 255 may refer to
Northwest Airlines Flight 255
Quebecair Flight 255

0255